Adham Mohammad Tumah Makhadmeh (born 1986) is a Jordanian football referee who has been a full international referee for FIFA since 2013.

References

External links 
 

1986 births
Living people
Jordanian football referees
AFC Asian Cup referees
People from Irbid